Clostridium haemolyticum is a species of bacteria in the family of Clostridiaceae. 

Based on 16S-rDNA sequence analysis, C. haemolyticum is closely related to C. novyi and C. botulinum. While C. haemolyticum has been suggested to be identical to C. novyi before, it is considered a valid species as of 2022.

References

haemolyticum
Bacteria described in 1929